Emperor Xiaojing may refer to:

Emperor Jing of Han (188–141 BC, reigned 157–141 BC), also known as Emperor Xiaojing
Emperor Xiaojing of Eastern Wei (524–552, reigned 534–550)
Li Hong (652–675), crown prince of the Tang dynasty, posthumously honored as Emperor Xiaojing